Equestrian was contested at the 1986 Asian Games in Seoul, South Korea. Equestrian was contested from 23 September to 4 October.

Japan and South Korea dominated the competition, winning all six gold medals.

Medalists

Medal table

References 
 New Straits Times, September 24 – October 5, 1986

External links 
 Olympic Council of Asia

 
1986 Asian Games events
1986
Asian Games